A microblogging novel, also known as a micro novel, is a fictional work or novel written and distributed in small parts, commonly seen on social media platforms like Twitter or Facebook.Compared to a traditional novels or novella, a micro novel can be written in short, interconnected lines or statements. For example, Twitter novels can be a series of tweets, within 140 characters per post, while a Facebook novel can be posted within 300 characters.

History 
Micro novels are related to blog fiction, which is published in blog format. Another related phenomenon is the cell phone novel where installments are sent out to readers via SMS; this type of publishing originated in Japan. Micro novels have also been known to be published through email. Similar manifestations include flash fiction, a work of fiction completed in 1000 words or less, where the publishing medium is irrelevant.

References 

Microblogging
Novel forms